Ashkelon Academic College (HaMiklala HaAkademit Ashkelon) is a public college in Ashkelon, Israel. The college has two faculties The School of Economics and Social Work for management, logistics, banking and accounting, in which undergraduate and graduate studies take place, as well as the School of Health Sciences for undergraduate studies in nutrition, nursing and public health.

The college provide programs in undergraduate studies in the fields of politics and government, computer science, sociology and anthropology, psychology, criminology, Palestine studies, tourism and multidisciplinary studies in the social sciences.

History 
The college was founded in 1967 as a branch of Bar-Ilan University and focused mainly on teaching accountancy and banking. Student numbers were only a couple of dozen.

In 1988 the management was changed and the college began to expand its activity; in 1990 it was recognised by the Education Minister of Israel Zevulun Hammer as a regional college, which meant its students spent the first two years in the college and after that transferred to Bar-Ilan University.

In 1992 Bar-Ilan University approved the college to grant bachelor's degrees on its behalf, and in 1998 the university transferred to a new campus. Moshe Many was President of the College from 2002 to 2012.

See also
List of universities and colleges in Israel

References

Colleges in Israel
Buildings and structures in Ashkelon